Najvažnije je biti zdrav (Being healthy is what's most important) is the debut studio album by the Serbian indie/alternative rock band Obojeni Program released by the Croatian independent record label Search & Enjoy in 1990. The album was released in LP and cassette format only and was rereleased on CD only as a part of the compilation album Obojeni program, which included of material from their first two studio albums.

Track listing 
All music and lyrics by Obojeni Program.

Personnel 
The band
 Bedov Miroslav — bass guitar
 Radić Robert — drums
 Bukurov Branislav — guitar
 Babić Branislav "Kebra" — vocals
 Žilnik Maša — vocals

Additional personnel
 Momir Grujić "Fleka" — design [colouring and packaging]
 Branislav Rašić — photography by
 Dušan Kojić "Koja" — production
 Miroslav Dukić "Geza" — recorded by

References 

 Najvažnije je biti zdrav at Discogs
 EX YU ROCK enciklopedija 1960-2006, Janjatović Petar; 
 NS rockopedija, novosadska rock scena 1963-2003, Mijatović Bogomir, SWITCH, 2005

Obojeni Program albums
1990 albums